Mecyclothorax eyrensis is a species of ground beetle in the subfamily Psydrinae. It was described by Blackburn in 1892.

References

eyrensis
Beetles described in 1892